{{DISPLAYTITLE:Lutetium (177Lu) chloride}}

Lutetium (177Lu) chloride is a radioactive compound used for the radiolabeling of pharmaceutical molecules, aimed either as an anti-cancer therapy or for scintigraphy (medical imaging). It is an isotopomer of lutetium(III) chloride containing the radioactive isotope 177Lu, which undergoes beta decay with a half-life of 6.65 days.

Medical uses 
Lutetium (177Lu) chloride is a radiopharmaceutical precursor and is not intended for direct use in patients. It is used for the radiolabeling of carrier molecules specifically developed for reaching certain target tissues or organs in the body. The molecules labeled in this way are used as cancer therapeutics or for scintigraphy, a form of medical imaging. 177Lu has been used with both small molecule therapeutic agents (such as 177Lu-DOTATATE) and antibodies for targeted cancer therapy

Contraindications 
Medicines radiolabeled with lutetium (177Lu) chloride must not be used in women unless pregnancy has been ruled out.

Adverse effects 
The most common side effects are anaemia (low red blood cell counts), thrombocytopenia (low blood platelet counts), leucopenia (low white blood cell counts), lymphopenia (low levels of lymphocytes, a particular type of white blood cell), nausea (feeling sick), vomiting and mild and temporary hair loss.

Society and culture

Legal status 
Lutetium (177Lu) chloride (Lumark) was approved for use in the European Union in June 2015. Lutetium (177Lu) chloride (EndolucinBeta) was approved for use in the European Union in July 2016.

On 21 July 2022, the Committee for Medicinal Products for Human Use (CHMP) of the European Medicines Agency (EMA) adopted a positive opinion, recommending the granting of a marketing authorization for the medicinal product Illuzyce, a radiopharmaceutical precursor. Illuzyce is not intended for direct use in patients and must be used only for the radiolabelling of carrier medicines that have been specifically developed and authorized for radiolabelling with lutetium (177Lu) chloride. The applicant for this medicinal product is Billev Pharma ApS. Illuzyce was approved for medical use in the European Union in September 2022.

References

External links 
 

Radiopharmaceuticals
Lutetium compounds
Chlorides
Orphan drugs